Scutiger maculatus, the spotted lazy toad or Piebald alpine toad, is a species of frog in the family Megophryidae.
It is endemic to China where it is known from Garze, northwestern Sichuan and Jiangda, eastern Tibet. Its natural habitats are temperate forests, temperate shrubland, subtropical or tropical high-altitude grassland, and rivers. It is threatened by habitat loss.

References

maculatus
Amphibians of China
Endemic fauna of China
Taxonomy articles created by Polbot
Amphibians described in 1950
Critically endangered fauna of China